Kip Williams is an Australian theatre and opera director. Williams is the current Artistic Director of Sydney Theatre Company. His appointment at age 30 made him the youngest artistic director in the company's history.

Biography
Williams has been a resident artist with Sydney Theatre Company (STC) since 2012. He was appointed Directing Associate in 2012 by then Artistic Directors Cate Blanchett and Andrew Upton. He was then appointed Resident Director in 2013, before being named Artistic Director and Co-CEO in November 2016.

Williams won the 2015 Helpmann Award for Best Direction of a Play for his production of Tennessee Williams's Suddenly Last Summer for Sydney Theatre Company. He won the 2016 Green Room Award for Best Director for his production of Miss Julie for Melbourne Theatre Company. He won the 2018 Sydney Theatre Award for Best Director for his production of The Harp in the South for Sydney Theatre Company. He won the 2021 Sydney Theatre Award for Best Director for his production of The Picture of Dorian Gray for Sydney Theatre Company. He won the 2022 Sydney Theatre Award for Best Director for his production of Strange Case of Dr Jekyll and Mr Hyde for Sydney Theatre Company.

Theatre
Williams has directed for many of Australia's leading theatre companies and festivals, including Sydney Theatre Company, Melbourne Theatre Company, Malthouse Theatre, Melbourne, Adelaide Festival, Perth Festival, Auckland Arts Festival, and Rising Festival.

Williams' first production for Sydney Theatre Company came in 2012, where at age 25 he directed Dylan Thomas's Under Milk Wood, at the Sydney Opera House, starring Jack Thompson. In 2013 he adapted and directed a reimagining of Romeo and Juliet, focussing the text on Juliet, again at the Sydney Opera House; as well as an all female production of William Golding's Lord of the Flies at Malthouse Theatre, Melbourne, as part of the Helium Festival. In 2014, for Sydney Theatre Company he directed productions of Macbeth starring Hugo Weaving and Maxim Gorky's Children of the Sun adapted by Andrew Upton.

In 2015, Williams directed a radical staging of Tennessee Williams's Suddenly Last Summer, using a blend of live video and stage action. The production earned him a Best Director nomination at the Sydney Theatre Awards, and won him the Helpmann Award for Best Direction of a Play. He also directed the Australian premiere of Caryl Churchill's Love and Information for Malthouse Theatre, Melbourne, and the Sydney Theatre Company. The production garnered Williams a second nomination for the Helpmann Award for Best Direction of a Play, as well as Best Director nominations from the Sydney Theatre Awards, and Melbourne's Green Room Awards.

In 2016, for STC Williams directed a revival of the Australian classic The Golden Age by Louis Nowra, Shakespeare's A Midsummer Night's Dream, and Arthur Miller's All My Sons, for which he was nominated for Best Director at the Sydney Theatre Awards. He also adapted and directed a production of Miss Julie for the Melbourne Theatre Company. It was his second time combining live video and stage action. The production was nominated for eight Green Room Awards, winning Best Production, Best Digital Media Design and Integration, and Best Director for Williams.

In 2017, Williams directed the Australian premiere of Lucy Kirkwood's Chimerica for Sydney Theatre Company. The production featured an ensemble cast of 32, including a chorus of students from NIDA, with set design by David Fleischer. Hailed "a triumph" by The Australian, Chimerica was nominated for two Helpmann Awards; Jason Chong for Best Actor, and Williams for Best Direction of a Play. This was followed by a staging of Caryl Churchill's Cloud 9, Williams' second professional production of a Churchill play. The production was nominated for nine Sydney Theatre Awards, including Best Production and Best Director for Williams. It was also nominated for two Helpmann Awards, Best Director for Williams, and Best Supporting Actor for Harry Greenwood. Later in 2017 he directed an adaptation by Andrew Upton of Chekhov's Three Sisters for the STC.

In 2018, Williams directed Bertolt Brecht's The Resistible Rise of Arturo Ui, starring Hugo Weaving in the titular role. The production was nominated for six Helpmann Awards, including Best Production, Best Director for Williams, and winning Best Supporting Actress and Best Actor for Anita Hegh and Weaving respectively. Later, it was nominated for a further nine Sydney Theatre Awards, again for Best Production and Best Director for Williams, and winning four awards including Best Actor for Weaving, Best Stage Design for Robert Cousins, and Best Supporting Actor for Mitchell Butel. Next Williams directed a 6 hour stage adaptation of The Harp in the South: Part One & Part Two by Kate Mulvany. The highly acclaimed production brought to life Ruth Park's celebrated trilogy of novels, Missus, The Harp in the South, and Poor Man's Orange, using an ensemble of 18 actors to perform the marathon work across two nights of theatre. The production was nominated for 11 Sydney Theatre Awards, winning Best Production, Best New Australian Work for Mulvany, and Best Direction for Williams. It was nominated for a further six Helpmann Awards, including Best Production of a Play, Best New Australian Work, and Best Director for Williams. Williams finished 2018 with an operatic take on Patrick White's classic play A Cheery Soul, featuring his signature use of live video. Staged at the Sydney Opera House, the production starred Sarah Peirse, with an ensemble including Anita Hegh, Shari Sebbens, and Tara Morice.

2019 saw Williams take on Tennessee Williams' masterpiece Cat on a Hot Tin Roof , in a contemporary adaptation featuring Zahra Newman, Harry Greenwood, Pamela Rabe, and Hugo Weaving as Big Daddy. The production marked Weaving and Williams' third time collaborating. This was followed by a gender blind staging of William Golding's Lord of the Flies. Starring Mia Wasikowska as Ralph, the production featured an ensemble including Joseph Althouse, Justin Amankwa, Nyx Calder, Yerin Ha, Daniel Monks, Mark Paguio, Rahel Romahn, Eliza Scanlen, Contessa Treffone, and Nikita Waldron.

In 2020 Williams wrote and directed an adaptation of Oscar Wilde's novel The Picture of Dorian Gray. The one-person show saw actor Eryn Jean Norvill play 26 characters in a two-hour performance at the Roslyn Packer Theatre that incorporated Williams' signature use of live video. Hailed a "tour de force" by The Guardian, the show received a slew five star reviews and was extended twice. The production was reprised in 2022, first touring to the Adelaide Festival, then playing a sold out return season in Sydney, followed by a sold out ten week season in Melbourne at the Arts Centre Melbourne, opening in Rising Festival and presented by Michael Cassel Group. The production received further five star reviews in Melbourne and Adelaide, including from The Age, which called the production a "dazzling masterpiece", and Time Out, which declared it a "reinvention of theatre". The production was nominated for six Sydney Theatre Awards, winning Best Production, Best Director for Williams, Best Performer for Norvill and Best Stage Design for Designer Marg Horwell.

In 2021 Williams reunited with playwright Kate Mulvany to direct her adaptation of Ruth Park's cult classic Playing Beatie Bow. The production starred Catherine Văn-Davies and Sophia Nolan, with Heather Mitchell and Guy Simon in supporting roles, and was the reopening work of the Sydney Theatre Company's newly renovated Wharf Theatres. The production was nominated for two Sydney Theatre Awards, Best Production for Young People and Best Supporting Actor for Mitchell. Following Sydney's second lockdown, Williams reopened STC's theatres with an innovative production of William Shakespeare's Julius Caesar. Adapted by Williams, the production was performed at The Wharf Theatre in-the-round by just three actors, Zahra Newman as Brutus, Ewen Leslie as Cassius and Caesar, and Geraldine Hakewill as Mark Antony, using live video filmed by the performers on mobile phones and displayed on a giant flying cube of LED screens. Time Out praised the work as bringing "Shakespeare's revered classic right up to the very minute", while The Guardian declared Williams a "technological innovator in theatre".

In addition to the national tour of Dorian Gray, 2022 saw Williams write and direct an acclaimed adaptation of Robert Louis Stevenson's Strange Case of Dr Jekyll and Mr Hyde. The production, starring Ewen Leslie and Matthew Backer, was the second part of Williams' trilogy of Victorian Gothic adaptations, further expanding his signature interweaving of live performance, live video, and prerecord video. The work received a rare five star review from the Sydney Morning Herald, which praised the work's "mind-boggling virtuosity". The production was nominated for six Sydney Theatre Awards, including Best Production and Best Original Score, and winning three awards including Best Director for Williams. Williams also directed and adapted a new production of Shakespeare's The Tempest starring Richard Roxburgh as Prospero. The production, featuring an ensemble including Guy Simon, Mandy McElhinney, Shiv Palekar, Claude Scott-Mitchell, Megan Wilding, and Susie Youssef, was designed by Jake Nash and was praised by The Guardian for its "outstanding" performances and "revolutionary approach" to the script, which interpolated texts from other Shakespeare works including Richard II, Pericles, The Merchant of Venice, and Hamlet in order to amplify the voices of Caliban and Miranda. The production was nominated for six Sydney Theatre Awards, winning Best Supporting Actor for Peter Carrol's performance of Ariel.

At the start of 2023, Williams revived his adaptations of The Picture of Dorian Gray and Strange Case of Dr Jekyll and Mr Hyde. Dorian Gray played a sold out third season in Sydney, before touring to Auckland Arts Festival, playing the Tiri Te Kanawa Theatre. Jekyll & Hyde played to five star reviews and standing ovations at His Majesty's Theatre as part of the Perth Festival. It will next play the Adelaide Festival.

Opera
Williams has directed extensively for Sydney Chamber Opera (SCO) since 2011, including productions of Peter Maxwell Davies's The Lighthouse, Fausto Romitelli's An Index of Metals, and stagings of J. S. Bach's cantata Ich habe genug and Jack Symmonds' Nunc dimittis.

He staged a song cycle for SCO and the 18th Biennale of Sydney titled Through the Gates, consisting of works from Shostakovich to Bach.

In 2017 he co-directed with Elizabeth Gadsby a gender bending reinterpretation of Benjamin Britten's chamber opera The Rape of Lucretia. The production involved singers lip synching and performing multiple characters in a radical reframing of Britten's original piece. The production was a co-production between Victorian Opera, SCO, and Dark Mofo, and premiered in Sydney at Carriageworks. It was revived in June 2018 for Dark Mofo and played at the Theatre Royal, Hobart.

Williams was set to direct Handel's Hercules for English National Opera in the Spring of 2020, but the production was postponed due to Coronavirus.

Education
Williams is a graduate of the National Institute of Dramatic Art (NIDA), and the University of Sydney.

Personal life

Williams is the grandson  of actress Wendy Playfair who had a lead role in the cult Australian television series Prisoner. Williams is also the nephew of Australian folk musician and composer Sean Cullip, of  the popular 1960s duo Sean and Sonja. Williams’s younger sister, Clemence Williams, is a composer who has written the score for many of his productions, including The Picture of Dorian Gray.

Awards

References

External links
 Kip Williams, Yellow Creative Management
 

Australian theatre directors
Year of birth missing (living people)
Place of birth missing (living people)
Living people
Helpmann Award winners
University of Sydney alumni
National Institute of Dramatic Art alumni